A bilinear form, a(•,•) whose arguments are elements of normed vector space V is a strongly positive bilinear form if and only if there exists a constant, c>0, such that
 

for all  where  is the norm on V.

References
 AMS 108 p.120

Functional analysis